Alexander Borodin's Scherzo in A-flat major is a lively piece written in 1885, while Borodin was in Belgium for an early performance of his then incomplete opera Prince Igor. It was originally written for solo piano, but in 1889 Alexander Glazunov orchestrated it, along with the Petite Suite. Borodin dedicated the piece to Théodore Jadoul, who made a four-hand piano arrangement of it.

Style
The Scherzo can be recognized as one of Borodin's compositions instantaneously because of its bright tone, pounding rhythms and exciting melodies. In the main theme of the piece a constant rhythm is used, giving it a clear beat, but unfortunately this also makes it very challenging for the pianist due to the constant jumps required. The piece often modulates, making it more interesting and varied. Played at the correct speed, the piece only lasts around three minutes. However, this "miniature" offers an admirable summary of its composer's style.

Recordings

The following pianists have recorded the piece:

Orchestration
In 1889, just two years after Borodin's death, Alexander Glazunov orchestrated the Petite Suite. Glazunov's orchestration of the Suite makes the 7th movement (Finale) the Scherzo, with the Nocturne inserted inside it as a trio section. The total length of the movement is around eight minutes.

See also
List of compositions by Alexander Borodin

References

External links
[ Scherzo in A-flat major] at Allmusic
Scores for Scherzo in A-flat major at the  International Music Score Library Project (IMSLP)
Scherzo in A-flat major played by Sergei Rachmaninoff at YouTube
Scherzo in A-flat major played by Margaret Fingerhut at YouTube

Compositions for solo piano
Compositions by Alexander Borodin
Piano compositions in the Romantic era
Piano compositions by Russian composers
1885 compositions
Compositions in A-flat major